Nancy Laura Spungen (February 27, 1958 – October 12, 1978) was the American girlfriend of English musician Sid Vicious, and a figure of the 1970s punk rock scene.

Raised Jewish in Philadelphia, Spungen was an emotionally disturbed child who was diagnosed with schizophrenia at age 15. After being expelled from college, she flew to London in December 1976 at the height of the punk rock movement and became involved with Vicious, the bass player of the Sex Pistols. Their relationship was punctuated by bouts of domestic violence and drug abuse. The press soon labeled Spungen "Nauseating Nancy" for her outrageous and frequently antisocial behavior. After John Lydon left the band and Vicious was made the new front man, the couple moved to New York City and checked into the Hotel Chelsea, where they spent much of their time using drugs, especially heroin.

In October 1978, Spungen was found dead in the bathroom of the couple's room, with a single stab wound to the abdomen. Vicious was charged with her murder, but died of a heroin overdose while on bail in February 1979 before the case went to trial. Various authors and filmmakers have speculated about Vicious' role in Spungen's death and the possibility that Spungen was killed by a drug dealer who frequently visited their room.

Early life
Nancy Laura Spungen was born on February 27, 1958, in Philadelphia, Pennsylvania, at the University of Pennsylvania Hospital, to Franklin "Frank" (1934–2010) and Deborah Spungen (born 1937). She was born with severe cyanosis and nearly died of oxygen deprivation after being choked by her umbilical cord during delivery. Spungen appeared to have had no brain damage and was released from the hospital eight days after birth. The Spungens were a middle-class Jewish family that resided in Lower Moreland Township, a suburb of Philadelphia. Spungen's father was a traveling salesman and her mother later owned an organic food store called The Earth Shop in nearby Jenkintown.

Young Nancy was a difficult baby, throwing crying fits and temper tantrums late into childhood. At three months old, she was prescribed a liquid barbiturate by a pediatrician, but her violent behavior persisted. In an interview, Spungen's mother stated, "I know it's normal for babies to cry, but Nancy did nothing but scream." Though she excelled academically, she had few friends during her elementary school years.

Spungen was a temperamental child who exhibited violent behavior toward her younger sister Susan, but was very caring toward her younger brother David. She allegedly threatened to kill a babysitter with scissors and attempted to batter her psychiatrist, who accused her of "acting out" for attention. At age 11, Spungen was expelled from public school when she went absent from class for more than two weeks. Weary of her erratic behavior, Spungen's parents enrolled her at Devereux Glenholme School in Connecticut and at Devereux Manor High School in Pennsylvania. In January 1972, Spungen ran away from Devereux Manor and attempted suicide by slitting her wrists with scissors. When she was aged 15, her psychiatrist diagnosed her with schizophrenia.

Education
Spungen graduated from Lakeside High School in 1974, two weeks after her application to attend the University of Colorado Boulder was accepted. She began attending the university at age 16, but five months into her freshman year she was arrested for purchasing marijuana from an undercover police officer. When she was later arrested for storing stolen property in her dorm room, the University of Colorado decided to expel her. Spungen's father traveled to Boulder and accepted a plea bargain for her, which resulted in her being banished from the state of Colorado.

Relationship with Sid Vicious
Spungen left home at age 17 and moved to New York City, where she supported herself for a time with sex work, amateur music journalism, and odd jobs at clothing stores. In her free time, she became a groupie and followed rock bands such as Aerosmith, Bad Company, the New York Dolls, and the Ramones. In December 1976, Spungen flew to London with the Heartbreakers and met the Sex Pistols, who later included bassist Sid Vicious; Spungen and Vicious soon moved in together.

During their tumultuous nineteen-month relationship, Spungen and Vicious (who was already abusing multiple drugs before meeting Spungen) became addicted to heroin. The tabloids dubbed Spungen "Nauseating Nancy" for her frequent public outbursts. After the Sex Pistols broke up in January 1978, Spungen and Vicious eventually moved to Hotel Chelsea in New York City. They stayed in Room 100, registered as "Mr. and Mrs. John Simon Ritchie", Vicious' real name.

Death
On October 12, 1978, Spungen's body was found under the wash basin in the bathroom of their room at the Hotel Chelsea. She had suffered a stab wound to the abdomen. It was long rumored that Vicious owned the knife that inflicted the injury, a "007" hunting knife that he had obtained after seeing Dee Dee Ramone give one to the Dead Boys' Stiv Bators, but the police report noted that the knife was a Jaguar Wilderness K-11 with a  blade. Vicious was immediately arrested and charged with second-degree murder. He pleaded not guilty and was released on bail, though he shared conflicting stories of the night Spungen died. Four months after her death, Vicious died of a heroin overdose before the trial could take place and the New York City Police Department closed the case. Spungen was buried in the King David Memorial Park, a traditional Jewish cemetery in Bensalem Township, Pennsylvania.

Aftermath
There are theories that do not implicate Vicious in Spungen's murder, such as one of the two drug dealers who had visited the hotel room that night, and that suggest that a robbery was involved, as certain items (including a substantial bankroll) were claimed to be missing from the room. In his book Pretty Vacant: A History of Punk, Phil Strongman accuses actor and stand-up comic Rockets Redglare of killing Spungen; Redglare had delivered drugs to the couple's room on the night of Spungen's death.

Throughout his life, Redglare, who died in 2001, steadfastly denied any involvement in Spungen's murder to the press but often "confessed" to the murder within his circle of friends, to mixed reaction. Friends such as Zoe Hansen took Redglare at his word, but others, including Howie Pyro, have cast doubt on his claims, saying that he was inclined to brag. Redglare also told the press that he believed that a drug dealer whom he had seen in the lobby of the Hotel Chelsea on the morning of Spungen's murder committed the crime.

In other media
"Horror Business", a 1979 song by the American punk rock band Misfits was inspired by Spungen's murder with song's lyrics, which include lines such as, "You don't go in the bathroom with me" and, "I'll put a knife right in you". Prior to Vicious's death, the Misfits were rumored to back Vicious on his proposed debut solo album. Additionally, Misfits bassist Jerry Only attended a dinner gathering at the apartment of Vicious' girlfriend Michelle Robinson the night that Vicious died.

Spungen's mother Deborah wrote the 1983 memoir And I Don't Want to Live This Life. Its title is taken from a poem Vicious wrote.

The 1986 British biopic Sid and Nancy, directed by Alex Cox, portrays the life of Vicious (played by Gary Oldman) and his relationship with Spungen (played by Chloe Webb). Critics praised Webb's performance as Spungen. In the film, Cox also put forth the theory that Spungen and Vicious had a suicide pact, but they got into an argument when Vicious reneged. The argument escalated when Spungen assaulted Vicious, who was trying to leave the apartment, and as portrayed in the film she was stabbed accidentally when she charged him while his knife was out.

Veronica Schanoes' story "Rats" appeared in the 2007 Interstitial Arts Foundation anthology Interfictions. The story is a punk rock fairytale inspired by Spungen's life. About her work, the author said: "I wrote 'Rats' because I was angry with the way the recent coffee-table histories of punk seem to have no problem demonizing a dead, mentally ill, teenage girl."

Alan G. Parker directed the 2010 documentary film Who Killed Nancy?, which includes interviews with Vicious and Spungen's associates, including John Holmstrom, Don Letts, Glen Matlock, and Howie Pyro.

In the 2022 miniseries Pistol Sid, portrayed by Louis Partridge, is shown waking up in a confused state the morning after Spungen's death with apparently vague recollections of an altercation the previous night. He is then horrified to find Nancy (Emma Appleton) dead in the bathroom. This version appears to accept Sid's account that he had no memory of how Nancy had been injured.

References

Sources

External links
 

1958 births
1978 deaths
1978 murders in the United States
20th-century American people
20th-century American women
American female erotic dancers
American expatriates in the United Kingdom
American people with disabilities
American prostitutes
Burials in Pennsylvania
Deaths by stabbing in New York (state)
Drug dealers
Female murder victims
Groupies
Jewish dancers
Jews in punk rock
Murdered American Jews
Sex workers murdered in the United States
People from Montgomery County, Pennsylvania
People from Philadelphia
People murdered in New York City
People with schizophrenia
Sex Pistols
University of Colorado Boulder alumni
Women in punk